Tony Martinez (born 11 December 1969) is a Belgian-Spanish professional darts player who competes in Professional Darts Corporation events.

At Q-School in 2022, Martinez won his Tour Card on by finishing fourth on the European Q-School Order of Merit, to get himself a two-year card on the PDC circuit.

Performance timeline 

PDC European Tour

References

External links

1969 births
Living people
Professional Darts Corporation current tour card holders
Belgian darts players
Spanish darts players